Yiu Cheuk Yin (or transliterated as Yiu Chuk Yin; 3 July 1928 – 1 February 2008) was a former Hong Kong footballer who represented Republic of China (Taiwan) in the Asian Games, AFC Asian Cup and in the Olympics, but spent his entire career in British Hong Kong, a colony of the British Empire.

Yiu also represented Hong Kong Chinese in a non-FIFA recognized match against Malayan Chinese in 1959 Ho Ho Cup.

Yiu, along with Mok Chun Wah and Ho Cheng Yau, was collectively known as the Three Aces of South China.

Honours

Republic of China
Asian Games Gold medal: 1954, 1958

References

External links
 
 

1928 births
2008 deaths
Hong Kong footballers
Taiwanese footballers
Hong Kong football managers
Hong Kong First Division League players
Footballers at the 1960 Summer Olympics
Olympic footballers of Taiwan
1960 AFC Asian Cup players
Chinese Taipei international footballers
Chinese Taipei international footballers from Hong Kong
Association football forwards
Asian Games medalists in football
Asian Games gold medalists for Chinese Taipei
Footballers at the 1954 Asian Games
Footballers at the 1958 Asian Games
Medalists at the 1954 Asian Games
Medalists at the 1958 Asian Games
yuen Long FC players
hong Kong Rangers FC players
kitchee SC players
south China AA players